The British Academy Television Award for Best Daytime is one of the major categories of the British Academy Television Awards (BAFTAs), the primary awards ceremony of the British television industry. The category was introduced in 2021. 

According to the BAFTA website, the category is for "programmes largely characterised by their high volume, long running or returnable nature, delivering consistent quality over a long run with restricted budget.", including "weekend programming, live format programming, drama and game based feature shows."

Winners and nominees

2020s 

Note: The series that don't have recipients on the tables had Production team credited as recipients for the award or nomination.

References

External links
List of winners at the British Academy of Film and Television Arts

Daytime